Chathur Mukham is a 2021 Indian techno-horror thriller film directed by Ranjeet Kamala Sankar and Salil V for the screenplay written by Abhayakumar K and Anil Kurian. The film stars Manju Warrier, Sunny Wayne and Alencier Ley Lopez, with Niranjana Anoop, Babu Annur, Shyamaprasad and Rony David in supporting roles. Manoj has edited the film while Abinandhan Ramanujam handled the cinematography. Dawn Vincent composed the original songs and background score. The film is jointly produced by Jiss Toms and Justin Thomas under Jiss Toms Movies and Manju Warrier Productions. In the film, Thejaswini, a young woman, buys a cheap smartphone after she loses her old one in an accident. Soon, she is terrorised by a malevolent supernatural entity through the phone, making her seek help.

Chathur Mukham is the story of that nightmare, when over acceptance and dependence on technology can take a turn for the worse, leaving one’s best friend as the worst enemy. The movie, with the international title 'The Fourth Face' is selected to the 25th Bucheon International Fantastic Film Festival (BIFAN) in South Korea, one of the premier festivals for fantasy and horror. It is showcased in the World Fantastic Red sections of the festival. It was selected to Chuncheon International Film Festival (CIFF) and Méliès International Festivals Federation (MIFF) as Asian entry.

Synopsis
Clement is a retired professor from the Kerala Agricultural University who has also been an avid science enthusiast all his life. Antony, a young man has come to meet Clement with a peculiar problem. He believes that Clement can find a solution to this 'never seen before' phenomenon. Over a cup of tea, Antony details the story of a young, bright woman – Thejaswini. She is a woman of today's times being a complete social media addict and constantly attached to her phone. Together with Antony, she runs a CCTV solutions business at Thiruvananthapuram. Thejaswini is from a middle-class family and believes that every girl should have a good education and attain financial stability before her nuptials. Thejaswini's parents are getting older and her sole sibling is an elder brother Bijesh who is not on talking terms with her. While attending a 'Mudiyattam' ritual at the Temple, an ‘accident’ renders Thejaswini’s smart phone useless.

With the intention of having a cheaper phone as a stand by for the time being, Thejaswini comes across an ‘unheard’ brand of phone on a local reseller website. The phone has attractive features, a low price and an accompanying free gift. Soon as she purchases the phone and it arrives via courier, unnatural events start to happen around her. These occurrences which seem way out of the normal, start to impact Thejaswini's work, self and even her body, so much so that she tries to get rid of the new purchase by various means, only to find it pulling her back to itself with greater force. Thejaswini suspects that there is something much deeper behind these events and that its somehow connected to her. She along with Antony set out on the journey to unravel the mystery behind the phone. What the eventual search leads to is life-threatening but Thejaswini and Antony depend on Clement to find a closure to this problem. Clement though shaken due to the ‘unexplainable’ incidents, consults his friend Ramachandran who advises him to keep aside the ego of a scientist and accept the issue to arrive at an out-of-the-box solution. Will the trio be able to arrive at a workable solution and execute it successfully before the supernatural phenomenon seizes their lives completely forms the rest of the story?

Cast 
 Manju Warrier as Thejaswini
 Sunny Wayne as Antony
 Alencier Ley Lopez as Clement
 Niranjana Anoop as Safiya
 Babu Annur as Thejaswini's father
 Shyamaprasad as Ramachandran
 Rony David as Naveen Joseph
 Srikant Murali as Philip Tharian
 Shaju Sreedhar as Dr. Manoj Thomas
 Kalabhavan Prajod as Bijesh
 Balaji Sarma as Zakaria
 Navas Vallikkunnu as Basheer
 Saranjith as Adarsh Paul

Production 
Chathur Mukham was filmed and completed during December 2019 and January 2020 at Trivandrum.

Music 

The first single from the film album, Mayakondu, was released by Manorama Music on 29 March 2021 in YouTube. The second song from the film album, the spooky Paathiyil theerunno, was released by Manorama Music on 8 July 2021 in YouTube.

Release

Theatrical
The film was released on 8 April 2021. Due to COVID-19 second wave in India, the movie was released in theatres for a week and then restricted because of increase in cases.

Home media
The film got digitally released on 9 July 2021 on VOD ZEE5 and Telugu dubbed version in Aha.

Reception

Box office
On the opening day , the film grossed around ₹15 crore. On the opening weekend , it grossed around ₹34.8 crore , with a one week collection around ₹39.02 crore. Due to the clash with Nizhal, collections went low and grossed ₹26 crore nett and ₹18 crore internationally.
In it's final run the movie grossed over ₹44 crore against a budget of ₹5.5 crore.

Critical response
Chathur Mukham opened to positive reviews, most of them praising Manju Warrier's performance as a social media addicted woman possessed by her smartphone, the same way a person can be possessed by a ghost. 

Baradwaj Rangan of Film Companion South reviewed, "A Techno-Horror With Solid Writing And Great Performances", and added "This is not the kind of horror movie where you get jump scares, even though I did jump out of my chair once. You could call the film eerie and gently supernatural.". S R Praveen of The Hindu noted that the film "has a few surprises up its sleeve" and added that "there is often an attempt to provide a scientific explanation for the happenings on the screen, with some of the characters even poking fun or dismissing the traditional Malayalam horror movie ingredients of black magic and exorcism". Sajin Shrijith of Cinema Express said that "It's a film brimming with a lot of interesting and surprising ideas" and noted that "the film, primarily billed as a techno-horror thriller, manages to effectively combine elements of other sub-genres too, namely body horror and found footage." Nirmal Narayan from IBTimes said that it is a "movie made with International standards, and it has all the elements to glue the audiences in their seats". Few critics had mixed thoughts about the movie. Anna Mathews of Times of India criticised that the makers have "created some scary moments, but the horror elements are not scripted strongly and 'logically' enough", but praised Manju Warrier's performance. She noted that "Manju Warrier carries the role like only she could, being light-hearted when needed and shifting gears to feeling fearful in the most convincing manner." Behindwoods Review Board reviewed that "The film has a trailblazing plot, which had enormous scope to be an edge of the seat horror, but the over-ripened dialogues and scenes impact its quality." and summarized that "Taking a diversion from the usual paranormal films, the writers and the directors have laid a foundation for something new in the genre. The film is technically prosperous, with great cinematography and fine VFX, but an engaging screenplay could have done wonders to this flick."
Sanjith Sidhardhan from OTTPlay noticed that "directors and scriptwriter to come up with novel concepts that movies like Ezra had employed, while ensuring that it passed the ‘logic’ test of the audience" and added that "Chathur Mukham also serves as a reminder of the value of relationships and the world around us that people seem to forget while obsessed with their virtual life." The Free Press Journal noted that Chathur Mukham decently scores as a supernatural thriller because of its novel premise, likable performances, and a focused screenplay that doesn’t have any forced or unrelated subplots. It begins on a thoughtful note pointing towards the present era in which the human race is fast becoming slave of its self-invented gadgets and social networks.

References

External links 
 

2020s Malayalam-language films
2021 films
Films shot in Thiruvananthapuram
Indian horror thriller films
Techno-horror films
2021 horror thriller films